Coleophora hymenocrateri is a moth of the family Coleophoridae. It is found in Turkmenistan.

The larvae feed on Hymenocrater bituminosus. They feed on the leaves of their host plant.

References

hymenocrateri
Moths described in 1988
Moths of Asia